Champigny is a railway station in the commune of Saint-Maur-des-Fossés, near the town Champigny-sur-Marne, Val-de-Marne, France. Champigny is on the A2 branch of the RER A with eastbound trains to Boissy-Saint-Léger and westbound trains to Saint-Germain-en-Laye. It is situated on the Grande Ceinture line.

Bus connections

The station is served by several buses:
 Situs Bus network line: 7 ;
  Noctilien network night bus line: .

References

Railway stations in France opened in 1859
Railway stations in Val-de-Marne
Réseau Express Régional stations